Püspökladány (pronounced ) is the sixth largest town of Hajdú-Bihar county in North Eastern Hungary with a population of approximately 16,000 people. It is located southwest of Debrecen at the juncture of three regions: Sárrét, Hortobágy and Nagykunság. It is an important transportation hub at the junction of national highway 4 from Budapest to Záhony, and national highway No. 42 from Romania to Biharkeresztes. The town is served by four different rail lines.

Twin towns – sister cities

Püspökladány is twinned with:
 Fischamend, Austria
 Ghindari, Romania
 Hämeenlinna, Finland
 Hattem, Netherlands
 Krasnystaw, Poland

References

External links

 in Hungarian
Health Spa in Püspökladány
Welcome to Püspökladány

Populated places in Hajdú-Bihar County